Malaysia Heritage Studios, formerly Mini Malaysia and ASEAN Cultural Park, is a cultural theme park in Ayer Keroh, Malacca, Malaysia. It is divided into two sections – the Mini Malaysia section, which was opened on 17 July 1986 and showcases the traditional houses from every state in Malaysia and the Mini ASEAN section, which was opened on 3 September 1991 and showcases the traditional houses from every member countries of the Association of Southeast Asian Nations (ASEAN).

On December 19, 2022, Mini Malaysia and ASEAN Cultural Park was renovated and reopened as "Malaysia Heritage Studios". Each of the houses in Mini Malaysia became into art galleries and museums, and the central area became a gallery for mythological creatures from Malay and local folklore, such as the Garuda bird. The first phase of the reopening was expected to last until December 31, 2022.

Exhibitions

Mini Malaysia

 Perlis Long Roofed House
 Penang Long Roofed House
 Kedah Long Roofed House
 Perak Long Roofed House
 Selangor Long Roofed House
 Negeri Sembilan Long Roofed House
 Malacca Long Roofed House
 Johore Five Roofed House
 Kelantan Long Roofed House
 Terengganu Five Roofed House
 Pahang Long Roofed House
 Sabah Traditional House
 Sarawak Traditional House

Mini ASEAN

 Traditional House of Thailand
 Traditional House of Philippines
 Traditional House of Brunei
 Traditional House of Indonesia
 Traditional House of Singapore
 Traditional House of Vietnam
 Traditional House of Myanmar
 Traditional House of Cambodia
 Traditional House of Laos

See also
 List of tourist attractions in Malacca

References

External links

 

1986 establishments in Malaysia
Amusement parks in Melaka
Amusement parks opened in 1986
Ayer Keroh